Serenissimus and the Last Virgin (German:Serenissimus und die letzte Jungfrau) is a 1928 German silent film directed by Leo Mittler and starring Hans Junkermann, Adolphe Engers and Adele Sandrock.

The film's art direction was by Kurt Richter.

Cast
 Hans Junkermann as Serenissimus  
 Adolphe Engers as Kindermann  
 Adele Sandrock as Fürstin-Tante, der Schrecken von Luxenstein  
 Ernö Verebes as Bob, Tanz-Adjutant  
 Margot Landa as Dina  
 Teddy Bill as Teddy, Reporter  
 Yvette Darnys as Yvette  
 Sig Arno as Clement  
 Max Schreck as Finanzminister von Krampf  
 Leopold von Ledebur as Notar Grünsprecht  
 Martin Wolfgang as Brillant, Theateragent  
 Ludwig Stössel as Direktor der Florida-Bar

References

External links

1928 films
Films of the Weimar Republic
Films directed by Leo Mittler
German silent feature films
German black-and-white films